Sleepaway Camp is an American slasher film franchise consisting of five films, one of which was not fully completed. The franchise primarily focuses on serial killer Angela Baker and the murders she commits, largely at summer camps.

Robert Hiltzik directed both the original 1983 film and Return to Sleepaway Camp, while Michael A. Simpson oversaw Sleepaway Camp II: Unhappy Campers and Sleepaway Camp III: Teenage Wasteland, which introduced comedic elements into the franchise; Sleepaway Camp IV: The Survivor was directed by Jim Markovic.

Films
The "Year" column in the table below lists the year of release. Sleepaway Camp II and III were filmed back-to-back in 1988, with the latter released the following year.

Sleepaway Camp IV began filming in 1992 but was not completed; some footage that was shot on the first day, just over half an hour long, was released as an exclusive fourth disc included with some editions of the Region 1 Sleepaway Camp box set. The footage was compiled and improved by the makers and official Sleepaway Camp sequels website creator John Klyza and made into a 70-minute film, which was released on March 23, 2012, with online distribution.

Return to Sleepaway Camp was shot in 2003 and initially planned for release in 2006; it was eventually released in 2008 after improvements to the special effects were made.

Sleepaway Camp Reunion was set for DVD release by Magnolia Pictures in October 2011, with a limited 3D release in theaters, but the film was not made. The script for another sequel, tentatively titled Sleepaway Camp: Berserk, was co-written by the director of Sleepaway Camp II and III, Michael A. Simpson, with Fred Willard, an author.

Overview
The original Sleepaway Camp was written and directed by Robert Hiltzik and released in 1983. The film opens in an idyllic lake in summer, and shows a man, John Baker, and his two children, Angela and Peter, swimming around and on board a boat. Another group of teenagers are motorboating and in a freak accident run over John and one of the children, killing them. The film then cuts to a few years later, with a shy and quiet Angela, played by Felissa Rose, living with her eccentric aunt Dr. Martha Thomas and cousin Ricky. Martha sends the young teens off to summer camp at Camp Arawak. After the arrival of the teenage campers, several are mysteriously murdered by an unseen killer. All of the victims had at one point teased or tormented Angela, dying soon after. It is not revealed until the twist ending of the film that the killer is in fact "Peter", who survived the boat accident and was raised as his deceased sister Angela by his aunt.

Sleepaway Camp II: Unhappy Campers was made and released in 1988, directed by Michael A. Simpson and written by Fritz Gordon. It follows another group of teenagers at a summer camp, this time named Camp Rolling Hills. This film introduces Pamela Springsteen as an older, more confident, happy and expressive Angela Baker, named "Angela Johnson" who, unlike the first film, is shown as the killer within the first few minutes of the film. It features comedic elements, mostly jokes made by Angela as she kills her fellow campers for being "bad" campers - disobeying the rules (e.g. having sex, smoking or swearing/harassing others), getting in her way or suspecting her of being psychopathic.

Sleepaway Camp III: Teenage Wasteland, filmed back-to-back with Unhappy Campers and largely featuring the same crew, follows Angela, who murders a prospective camper named Maria and takes her identity and place at the reopened Camp Rolling Hills, renamed Camp New Horizons, and is looking to change its reputation and brand to one of friendship amongst teenagers of different social classes and racial backgrounds. The campers are separated into groups with adult leaders, but Angela/Maria makes her way around the woods, integrating herself into the groups and killing the campers and leaders. Angela shows more of a sense of abandon in killing the campers this time around, some of whom she kills for next to no reason.

Sleepaway Camp IV: The Survivor was the planned fourth entry in the series and was partially filmed in 1992 before being abandoned due to the production company, Double Helix Films, going bankrupt. It follows a "survivor" of the original three films, Alison, who seeks psychiatric help after having nightmares about the camp site and the murders that took place there. She then travels back to the camp after receiving advice that revisiting might help her overcome her problems. After several events (and murders), however, she begins to suspect she may be Angela without knowing it, being revealed near the film's conclusion.

After years of tracking down those involved with the film's production including the director Jim Markovic, a team helped to uncover and compile additional footage, incorporating scenes from the first three films into flashback sequences and helping expand the initial 34-minute running time of the first day of takes from The Survivor and make them into a full-length, 70-minute completed film. It was released online on March 23, 2012 (although it was initially announced that there would "likely not be a specific release date") and is manufactured on-demand.

The following film in the franchise, Return to Sleepaway Camp, was filmed from September to November 2003, but due to supposedly poor special effects, its straight-to-DVD release was delayed until 2008 in order to have time to improve them. It again features Robert Hiltzik as director and writer. The film ignores the plotline of the second and third film. It follows another, more chaotic camp, Camp Manabe, with an overweight, trouble-making and bullied teenage boy named Alan as its main character. Murders are again committed by an unknown person at the camp, but it is revealed that Angela has made a return in another disguise, a male police officer named Sheriff Jerry who uses an artificial voice box due to supposedly having had throat cancer.

Hiltzik reportedly planned a further sequel following Return titled Sleepaway Camp Reunion, initially announced to be released in October 2011, but it is unknown if it evolved past the pre-production stages. It was set to have a limited release to theaters in 3D and would see the return of Angela, Ricky and Aunt Martha.

Similarly to Reunion, another entry in the series was co-written by the director of Sleepaway Camp II and III, Michael A. Simpson despite the fact that Simpson had no claim to the rights of the series. It was prospectively titled Sleepaway Camp: Berserk and reportedly introduced supernatural aspects into the series, but as of 2017, nothing has materialized.

In 2013, the franchise was set to be rebooted, but no progress was made like for the other aborted projects. 

In December 2020, Felissa Rose had said that a sixth Sleepaway Camp film is in the works. She also said that she would be interested in playing Angela again.

Cast and characters
This table shows the principal characters and the actors who have portrayed them throughout the franchise.
A dark grey cell indicates the character was not in the film, or that the character's presence in the film has not yet been announced.
A  indicates a cameo appearance.
A  indicates an appearance in onscreen photographs only.
A  indicates an appearance in archival footage only.
A  indicates a voice only role.
A  indicates a younger version of the role.

Reception

Box office performance

Critical reception

Home media
For the first three Sleepaway Camp movies, early home video releases were made available. Each of the films from the original trilogy have been released in several countries around the world. In the United States, Sleepaway Camp was released not long following its theatrical exhibition. Its sequels Sleepaway Camp II: Unhappy Campers and Sleepaway Camp III: Teenage Wasteland were released on VHS format via Nelson Entertainment in October 1988 and December 15, 1989 respectively. In the United Kingdom, Sleepaway Camp was released on pre-cert VHS. Sleepaway Camp II and III were both released in cut versions under the titles Nightmare Vacation II and III. In part 2, the scenes removed were the tongue removal scene and Ally's drowning in the toilet scene. Both II and III were released via Futuristic Entertainment in the UK in the early 1990s. Both these versions were again released on DVD in the UK via 23rd Century Entertainment in low quality and still in their cut versions.

DVD

Blu-ray

Popular culture
In 2009, Felissa Rose reprised her role as Angela Baker in Caesar and Otto's Summer Camp Massacre, a spoof of the Sleepaway Camp film series.

Notes

References

External links
 Official site

American film series
Slasher film series
Film series introduced in 1983